Pachystyla rufozonata was a species of small air-breathing land snail, a terrestrial pulmonate gastropod mollusk in the family Euconulidae, the hive snails.

This species was endemic to Mauritius; it is now extinct.

References

rufozonata
Extinct gastropods
Gastropods described in 1867
Taxonomy articles created by Polbot